The redevelopment of Mumbai's cotton mills began in 1992, when efforts began to demolish the numerous cotton mills that once dotted the landscape of Mumbai, India, to make way for new residential and commercial buildings, as part of the wider modernization of Mumbai.

The cotton mill era and its decline 
The mills of Girangaon were once integral to Mumbai's economy, particularly during the British colonial period, when Mumbai (then known as Bombay) was often referred to as the "Manchester of the East". However, with the development of newer industries in and around Mumbai, these mills ceased to be profitable, and fell into a state of disrepair.

In the first half of the nineteenth century, India exported cotton to Britain, and then reimported the textile. In 1820, the total textile import was valued at Rs. 350,000. However, the cost had escalated significantly by 1860, when textile imports stood at Rs. 19.3 million. The impetus towards the founding of a cotton industry came from Indian entrepreneurs. The first Indian cotton mill, "The Bombay Spinning Mill", was opened in 1854 in Bombay by Cowasji Nanabhai Davar. Opposition from the Lancashire mill owners was eventually offset by the support of the British manufacturers of textile machinery.

The cotton mills of Bombay, and the rest of India, were owned and managed mainly by Indians. The initial investments came from families of the mill-owners, mainly obtained from trading. Later, when shares became available to the public, much of the ownership still remained Indian – of the 53 mills in the city in 1925, only 14 were British-owned. The management and directorships of these mills were also mainly Indian; of the 386 directorships recorded in 1925, only 44 were English.

By 1870, there were 13 mills in Bombay. Cotton exports grew during the American Civil War, when supplies from the United States's cotton plantations were interrupted. At the end of 1895, there were 70 mills; growing to 83 in 1915. A period of stagnation set in during the recession of the 1920s. In 1925, there were 81 mills in the city. After World War II, under strong competition from Japan, the mills declined. In 1973, there remained only 79 active mills in the city.

Gradually, the government relaxed its norms that once restricted the redevelopment of mill lands, and as a result, numerous high-profile builders quickly took possession of these land parcels. Between 1990 and 2010, the majority of these mill lands were acquired and redeveloped.

List of mills in Mumbai 
The table below lists the names and district locations of Mumbai's former mills, and the structures (if any) that stand on their land today. This list is not exhaustive.

See also
Brownfield land
List of tallest buildings in Mumbai
Urban regeneration

References

External links 

 "The Cotton Mills" –  article by Tata Institute of Fundamental Research, Mumbai

Economy of Mumbai
Economic history of India (1947–present)
Redevelopment
Real estate in India
Textile industry in Maharashtra
History of Mumbai (1947–present)
Land management in India